"La Noche de Anoche" (stylized in all caps) is a song recorded by Puerto Rican rapper Bad Bunny in collaboration with Spanish singer Rosalía from his third studio album El Último Tour Del Mundo (2020). The track was written by both performers alongside Tainy and Chris Jedi and produced by the latter two with Gaby Music. A fan favorite, it was released as the fourth and final single off the album on February 14, 2021, through Rimas Entertainment along with its music video.

Background 
The performers first met at the Coachella Valley Music and Arts Festival in April 2019, where they took some pictures that would later be used to promote the single. A couple days later, Bad Bunny went to see Rosalía live at the Mayan Theater in Los Angeles, which led to many rumors about a future musical collaboration and a possible romance, which was later denied. In July 2020, when travel restrictions caused by the COVID-19 pandemic started to lift, Rosalía travelled to San Juan to work on her upcoming studio album. There she worked with Tainy, Chris Jeday, Gaby Music and Tego Calderón among others. Bad Bunny later told Billboard that they and Rosalía wanted to work together for a long time but that the right song or moment hadn't come up but that, while in Puerto Rico, Jeday sent him a rhythmic base that he had been working on with the Spanish singer and "I thought it was cool, but I let it sit for a while. A couple days later I couldn't stop singing the song. So I told Chris I would take a stab and see what comes out".

On November 25, Bad Bunny surprisingly revealed the cover art, tracklist and release date for his third studio album after announcing in YHLQMDLG that he would release an album nine months after that one and then retire for an indefinite period of time, but the pandemic situation made him change his mind. "La Noche de Anoche", released two days later, became an instant fan favorite and a remarkable one for critics.

Composition 
"La Noche de Anoche" is a mid-tempo reggaeton track incorporating pop.

Commercial performance 
"La Noche de Anoche" has had a big success on streaming platforms. The collaboration reached a huge commercial success, debuting at number two on the Spotify global chart with 6.63 million streams in a single day, marking the biggest debut for a song fully sung in Spanish in history. It also marked the ninth best debut on the platform in 2020 and the second biggest debut on Spotify Spain in music history. He performed the song along with Rosalía during his stint on Saturday Night Live on February 20.

Charts

Weekly charts

Year-end charts

Certifications

Release history

See also
List of Billboard number-one Latin songs of 2021

Notes

References 

2021 songs
2021 singles
Bad Bunny songs
Rosalía songs
Songs written by Bad Bunny
Songs written by Rosalía
Songs written by el Guincho
Spanish-language songs
Male–female vocal duets
Songs written by Tainy
Songs written by Chris Jedi